Falling is a 2015 Nigerian romantic drama film written and produced by Uduak Isong Oguamanam, and directed by Niyi Akinmolayan. It stars Desmond Elliot, Blossom Chukwujekwu, Adesua Etomi, Tamara Eteimo and Kofi Adjorlolo.

The film narrates the story of a young couple, Muna (Adesua Etomi) and Imoh (Kunle Remi); Muna has to live with the effects of an accident that has left Imoh deeply unconscious for several months.

Plot 
The film tells a story of Muna (Adesua Etomi) and Imoh (Kunle Remi), a happily married young couple. On his way to work, Imoh had an accident that got him to coma. Despite monetary challenges, Muna continued believing that Imoh will regain consciousness. After the hospital decided to discharge Imoh in his condition, Muna seeks help from her dad, Mr Mba (Kofi Adjorlolo), who gave her part of the money needed for him to continue to use the life support at least for a month. Muna's sister, Tina, (Tamara Eteimo), is worried that Muna is allowing her husband's situation get the best of her and Imoh might never be fully healthy. She convinced Muna to follow her to an event, to the distaste of Muna. On getting to the club, Tina's friend, Yemi (Blossom Chukwujekwu) tries to woo Muna, after Tina tells him about Muna's situation. The next day, Muna got angry with Tina, who explained that Yemi is a medical doctor and might be able to assist that was why she told him personal information concerning her husband. Despite Yemi's advances to become friends, Muna is reluctant in reciprocating his kindness towards her. After some months, they get to know each-other more and Muna began to get herself together again despite Imoh still in coma. She got her script-writing job back despite a lack of recommendation from her producer, (Deyemi Okanlawon) earlier. While having fun with Yemi, Muna got caught in the moment and had sex with him. The sexual encounter resulted to pregnancy. A few days after Muna is aware of being pregnant Imoh regained consciousness and was discharged from the hospital.

Imoh began acting strange as suspected by Yemi. Muna tells him about the pregnancy and he instructed her to abort it. This led to struggles in their relationship. After Yemi knows of the child, he told Muna that she must keep it and this could be a sign that they were meant to be together. Mr Mba gets hospitalized while having sex with his new much younger wife, Lota Chukwu. While speaking with Muna, Tina and their mum of his past mistakes, Imoh walks in and reconciles with Muna. They both agree to keep the baby.

Cast
Adesua Etomi as Muna
Kunle Remi as Imoh
Blossom Chukwujekwu as Yemi
Tamara Eteimo as Tina
Desmond Elliot as himself
Kofi Adjorlolo as Mr Mba
Deyemi Okanlawon as Producer

Production and release
Falling was shot on location in Lagos for a period of two weeks. This film is Uduak Isong Oguamanam's first solo effort as a film producer. Teaser posters for the film was released online in May 2015. A trailer for the film was released on 5 May 2015. Another poster was released online in July 2015. Uduak announced that the film would premiere on 18 September 2015 and be generally released on the same day.

Awards and nominations

References

External links

English-language Nigerian films
Nigerian romantic drama films
2015 romantic drama films
Films shot in Lagos
Films set in Lagos
Medical-themed films
Films directed by Niyi Akinmolayan
2010s English-language films